In the final, Nathalie Dechy and Mara Santangelo defeated Iveta Benešová and Barbora Záhlavová-Strýcová, 6–3, 6–4.

Seeds

Draw

Draw

External links
Main draw

Monterrey Open
Monterrey Open